The Bolsterlanger Horn is a grass mountain in the  Allgäu Alps in Bavaria. Because its 1,586-metre-high summit rises above Bolsterlang, it is the local mountain (Hausberg) of this village. The Bolsterlanger Horn is part of the Hörner Group and its southernmost peak. The topographic prominence of the Bolsterlanger Horn is at least 46 metres, its isolation is 600 metres, the Weiherkopf being the reference summit.

Ascent 
The normal route runs from the top station of the Hörnerbahn along a forest path and only takes about a 10-minute walk to the top.

Features 
In 2009 the path to the summit from the Hörnerbahn was made into a "reflection" walk.

Summit cross 
At the top is a summit cross with mirrors which light up in the sunshine.

References and footnotes

External links 
 Information about the Hörnerbahn

One-thousanders of Germany
Mountains of the Alps
Mountains of Bavaria
Allgäu Alps
Oberallgäu